The 2009 season was the Cork senior hurling team's 122nd consecutive season appearing in the Championship, and their 78th season appearing in the National Hurling League. The season has, for a second year running, began badly as the hurling panel withdrew their services because their confidence in manager Gerald McCarthy has been eroded.

Panel statistics

Management teams

Following the resignation of Gerald McCarthy and his selectors, the following management team was put in place on a temporary basis on 12 March 2009.

Hurling panel

Waterford Crystal Cup game

National League games

Cork
Cork county hurling team seasons